Carolin Bachmann (born 3 September 1988 in Freiberg) is a German politician from Alternative for Germany (AfD). She has been Member of the German Bundestag for Mittelsachsen in Saxony since 2021.

References 

Living people
1988 births
People from Freiberg
21st-century German politicians
21st-century German women politicians
Female members of the Bundestag
Members of the Bundestag 2021–2025
Alternative for Germany politicians
Members of the Bundestag for Saxony